
Gmina Maszewo is a rural gmina (administrative district) in Krosno Odrzańskie County, Lubusz Voivodeship, in western Poland.

The gmina contains part of the protected area called Krzesin Landscape Park.

Villages
Gmina Maszewo contains the villages and settlements of Bytomiec, Chlebów, Gęstowice, Granice, Korczyców, Lubogoszcz, Maszewo, Miłów, Połęcko, Radomicko, Rybaki, Rzeczyca, Siedlisko, Skarbona, Skórzyn and Trzebiechów.

Neighbouring gminas
Gmina Maszewo is bordered by the gminas of Bytnica, Cybinka, Gubin, Krosno Odrzańskie and Torzym.

Twin towns – sister cities

Gmina Maszewo is twinned with:
 Loitz, Germany
 Mölln, Germany

References

External links
 Gmina Maszewo, Lubuskie

Maszewo
Gmina Maszewo